Chaigneau may refer to:

People
Florent Chaigneau (born 1984), French professional footballer
Jean-Baptiste Chaigneau (1769–1832), French soldier and adventurer
Suzanne Chaigneau (1875–1946), French musician

Other
Chaigneau (grape), French wine grape that is also known as Enfariné noir
Chaigneau-Brasier, French car manufacturer
Chaigneau Peak, Antarctic mountain